Apimela is a genus of beetles belonging to the family Staphylinidae.

The species of this genus are found in Europe and America.

Species

Species:

Apimela angkorensis 
Apimela aptera 
Apimela arcuata

References

Staphylinidae
Staphylinidae genera